Operation Yewtree was a British police investigation into sexual abuse allegations, predominantly the abuse of children, against the English media personality Jimmy Savile and others. The investigation, led by the Metropolitan Police Service (Met), started in October 2012. After a period of assessment, it became a full criminal investigation, involving inquiries into living people, notably other celebrities, as well as Savile.

The report of the investigations into the activities of Savile himself was published, as Giving Victims a Voice, in January 2013. Operation Yewtree continued as an investigation into others, some but not all linked with Savile. By October 2015, 19 people had been arrested by Operation Yewtree; seven of these arrests led to convictions. The "Yewtree effect" has been credited for an increase in the number of reported sex crimes, while the operation also sparked a debate on police procedure and rights of those accused of sex crimes.

Background

An ITV documentary, Exposure: The Other Side of Jimmy Savile, researched and presented by former police detective Mark Williams-Thomas, was broadcast on 3 October 2012, almost a year after Savile's death. The programme contained several allegations by women who said that, as teenagers, they had been sexually abused by radio and television personality Jimmy Savile, who had gained access to them through the television programmes he had presented and his charity work. Following the broadcast, many other people came forward to make allegations about Savile's conduct towards young people, including sexual abuse that had taken place on BBC premises and in hospitals to which Savile had access.

Initial assessments
On 4 October 2012, the Metropolitan Police said it would take the national lead in a process of assessing the allegations. The assessment was undertaken by the Serious Case Team of the service's Child Abuse Investigation Command, led by Detective Superintendent David Gray working closely with the BBC. The police said, "Our priority will be to ensure a proportionate and consistent policing response putting the victims at the heart of our enquiries", and that "it is not an investigation at this stage".

The Metropolitan Police announced on 9 October that the inquiry into the allegations would be called Operation Yewtree, and would be undertaken jointly with the NSPCC. The police had formally recorded eight allegations against Savile, but announced they were following 120 lines of inquiry, covering up to 25 victims of abuse, mainly girls aged between 13 and 16. The allegations covered four decades, from 1959 until the 1980s, and were on "a national scale". Commander Peter Spindler, head of specialist crime investigations, said, "At this stage it is quite clear from what women are telling us that Savile was a predatory sex offender."

"Yewtree" was chosen from a list of names which are intended to be neutral and unrelated to each particular case. This system, dating back to the 1980s, is used for operations which are started to handle specific crimes, as opposed to more general, pro-active operations with names connected to their intent.

Criminal investigation

The Metropolitan Police launched a criminal investigation on 19 October 2012 as, in addition to the historic allegations of child sex abuse by Savile, there were "lines of inquiry involving living people that require formal investigation". The criminal investigations within Operation Yewtree were led by Detective Chief Inspector Michael Orchard as the Senior Investigating Officer and overseen by Chief Superintendent Keith Niven, head of the Metropolitan Police's child abuse investigation command, and by December 2012, 30 officers were involved with the case. Noting that the operation was "dealing with alleged abuse on an unprecedented scale" and that it "empowered a staggering number of victims to come forward to report the sexual exploitation which occurred during their childhood", Commander Peter Spindler said that: "We are dealing with a major criminal investigation. This is a watershed moment for child abuse investigations and Yewtree will be a landmark investigation." The operation follows three strands: allegations against Savile, allegations against Savile and others, and allegations just involving others. On 11 December, the Metropolitan Police stated that the investigation of the abuse undertaken by Savile had been completed and the report into his alleged offending, Giving Victims a Voice, was released in January 2013.

The investigation into "others" continued after the Savile investigation concluded. In May 2013, The New York Times reported that "at least 69 police officers and staff members" were involved in the operation and that many of the suspects were celebrities. The operation passed files to South Yorkshire Police in the investigation of Cliff Richard, and passed files to North Yorkshire Police in the investigation of Jimmy Tarbuck. Neither case resulted in charges. In June 2016, after child abuse allegations regarding Clement Freud were made public, it was reported that Operation Yewtree had been passed information about Freud in 2012 when two alleged victims made accusations to the NSPCC. 

In late 2015, Operation Yewtree was folded into Operation Winter Key, the Met's component of Operation Hydrant. A December 2015 freedom of information disclosure revealed that Scotland Yard had spent £2.2m a year on Operation Yewtree.

Arrests leading to convictions

Other arrests

Giving Victims a Voice

The joint report prepared by the Metropolitan Police Service and the NSPCC, Giving Victims a Voice, was published in January 2013, and marked the end of investigations under Operation Yewtree into Savile alone. It reported that sex offences were committed by Savile on 450 people (328 being children at the time), across England and Scotland, with allegations also made in Jersey. The vast majority of offences occurred in his home town of Leeds and in London, his main place of work.

Allegations associating Savile with abuse at Jersey children's home Haut de la Garenne were made in 2008, during Savile's lifetime. He commenced legal action against The Sun newspaper in response; Savile's lawyer said "The reported events are the antithesis of everything Sir James has worked tirelessly to prevent". No action was taken against Savile at this time.

The victims were "mainly not known to each other". His youngest victim was aged , the oldest 47. Most were aged 1316, with 73% being under 18 and the majority being minors. The attacks included 18 girls and 10 boys under the age of 10, and were mostly against young girls aged under 16.

The offences were mostly opportunistic, although child grooming was involved in some cases. The first and final known offences were in 1955 and 2009 respectively. The period containing most frequent offending was between 1966 and 1976 (when he was aged 4050), coinciding with his "peak [celebrity] status". The most frequent offending was during 1975 and 1976 with each year having 15 offences recorded in it.

Most allegations had not previously been reported to authorities, with victims stating reasons of fear of disbelief or distrust of the judicial system. At least seven allegations of sexual assault made to police during Savile's lifetime were not linked. The CPS said prosecutions "might have been possible" in connection with allegations made to Surrey Police between 2007 and 2009.

Savile's celebrity status meant that he was considered to have been "hiding in plain sight". Operation Yewtree's senior investigating officer, DSI David Gray, said Savile used Jim'll Fix It "as a vehicle to gain access to victims".

Approximately 600 people had provided information at the time of the publication of the Savile report, Giving Victims a Voice, of which 450 related to Savile. A total of 214 criminal offences were formally recorded across 28 police forces. The NSPCC described Savile as "one of the most prolific sex offenders in its 129-year history". The BBC restated a "sincere apology to the victims".

Concurrent investigations

Other high-profile arrests

During Operation Yewtree, several other high-profile British public figures were investigated for sexual offences. These included television and radio presenter Stuart Hall, who was convicted of 15 counts of indecent assault, ITV Granada weatherman Fred Talbot, who was jailed after being found guilty of sexually assaulting two schoolboys, and DJ and friend of Savile, Ray Teret, who was found guilty of seven rapes and eleven indecent assaults and was sentenced to 25 years imprisonment. Coronation Street actors William Roache and Michael Le Vell were both separately found not guilty of all charges made against them, and DJ Neil Fox was acquitted of several charges.

Although these allegations, investigations and prosecutions were not directly connected to Operation Yewtree, they were linked in public imagination. In particular, Roache's defence argued that Operation Yewtree had created an atmosphere in which allegations of sexual abuse against celebrities were more likely to be taken to prosecution, while several other commentators speculated that the decision in particular to prosecute Roache and Le Vell may have been influenced by the high profile of Yewtree.

Operation Hydrant

In response to a large increase of complainants coming forward in the summer of 2014 in the wake of the Savile scandal, Operation Hydrant, a new operation into historical child sex abuse allegations was launched by the National Police Chiefs' Council (NPCC). As of 20 May 2015, 1433 suspects – including 261 of "public prominence" (135 from TV, film or radio) and 666 from institutions (including 154 from schools, 75 from children's homes, 40 from religious institutions and 14 medical establishments) – have been identified. Operation Hydrant is not responsible for conducting independent investigations; it gathers information from other inquiries, including Operation Yewtree.

Operation Ravine
Operation Ravine is an investigation by Surrey Police into alleged sexual abuse connected to the Walton Hop disco. A previous investigation into the Walton Hop disco, Operation Arundel, resulted in the convictions of Chris Denning and music mogul Jonathan King for child sex offences in the early 2000s. Matthew Kelly was also arrested in 2003, but subsequently cleared of all charges. In January 2014, Merseyside Police carried out an independent review of Operation Arundel and related materials were shared with Operation Yewtree. On 10 September 2015, three men were arrested as part of Operation Ravine, including Jonathan King. Denning was charged with six offences stemming from the investigation on 7 June 2016, and he pleaded guilty to 21 offences on 22 August 2016. Denning, who was already sentenced to 13 years stemming from his Yewtree convictions, was sentenced to an additional 13 years for these offences on 7 October. King stood trial in June 2018 but the jury was discharged for legal reasons. On 6 August 2018, King received an apology for the collapse of the trial, with Judge Deborah Taylor saying that Surrey Police had made "numerous, repeated and compounded" errors during the investigation, describing the situation as a "debacle".

Operation Midland

In response to increasing public outcry and government pressure in the wake of the Savile scandal, Metropolitan Police launched Operation Midland in November 2014, to investigate allegations of child abuse against several high-profile British citizens in positions of authority. The operation was conducted over eighteen months against a group of 12 men, but unlike other child abuse cases being investigated, detectives conducting the investigations made several critical errors in regards to the allegations made, the treatment of those accused, and the evidence supplied to them, and failed to find sufficient evidence to support the accusations against the group. The operation ended in March 2016 as a complete failure, causing considerable damage to those accused, damaged the likelihood of genuine victims of abuse coming forward, and cost the Metropolitan Police several millions of pounds in operational costs, compensation, and subsequent investigations against the individual who made the allegations. A 2016 inquiry into the conduct of the police taskforce damned the operation for its failings and left considerable questions over the investigative conduct into the accountability of officers for misconduct. The individual who made the false allegations, Carl Beech, was later charged in 2018, and jailed for eighteen years in 2019.

Reactions and analysis
Yewtree was credited for an increase in the reporting of sexual offences. Dubbed the "Yewtree effect", reports of sexual offences recorded by police rose 17% by 2013. In 2019, Louis Theroux compared Operation Yewtree to sexual abuse allegations made against Hollywood producer Harvey Weinstein, which led to the Weinstein effect and created a global trend in which powerful men were accused of sexual misconduct.

In response to some having labelled Operation Yewtree a "witch-hunt", Joan Smith of The Guardian stated that the conviction of Max Clifford vindicated the operation, and Martin Evans of The Daily Telegraph said that despite several high-profile failures, Rolf Harris' conviction vindicated it. Metropolitan Police Commissioner Bernard Hogan-Howe denied claims of a witch-hunt, commenting that the alternative would be to ignore allegations. Paul Gambaccini, who was arrested and bailed repeatedly for a year before being told he would face no further action, testified before the House of Commons Home Affairs Select Committee on 3 March 2015. He told MPs he was the victim of a witch-hunt and that he was used as human "fly paper" to encourage other people to come forward and make allegations against him. Director of Public Prosecutions Alison Saunders denied the allegations. In a November 2015 debate organized by the NSPCC on whether investigations into historic sexual abuse had turned into "media witch-hunts", former Metropolitan Police commander Peter Spindler said that police "got some things wrong" and that they "didn't have sufficient resources in place".

In an article for The Spectator, Rod Liddle criticised the handling of these cases by police, especially in the case of Freddie Starr, who was arrested four times and bailed nine times before being told he would not be charged, claiming: "the way the police have conducted the process is hugely unfair". In the aftermath of Cliff Richard's August 2014 property search, human rights barrister Geoffrey Robertson wrote in The Independent that the long delays before announcing charges amounted to "outrageous treatment", adding: "This has been one of the most intolerable features of other high-profile arrests for 'historic' offences, namely the inability of police and prosecutors to deliver Magna Carta’s truly historic promise that justice will not be delayed." After others, including Jim Davidson and Gambaccini, were left on bail for many months before being told they would not face charges, then-Home Secretary Theresa May proposed that bail time be limited to 28 days. The 28-day limit came into effect in April 2017.

Noting that some of the high-profile arrests did not lead to convictions, Variety described Operation Yewtree as a "botched" investigation. At a Labour Party conference in July 2014, comedian and friend of Gambaccini Stephen Fry criticised the operation, pointing out that fewer than half of those accused at the time had been found guilty, and called for tougher laws to prevent false sex abuse allegations. MP Nigel Evans, who was cleared of unrelated sexual assault charges, called for individuals to receive anonymity until charged after the CPS announced that it would not charge Gambaccini. Although the case against Dave Lee Travis resulted in a conviction on one count of indecent assault for groping an adult woman's breast for 15 seconds in 1995, Rosie Millard and Carole Malone wrote separate opinion pieces in The Independent and The Daily Mirror respectively in which they questioned whether police resources should have been spent pursuing other crimes.

In February 2016, the late Irish Supreme Court Judge Adrian Hardiman criticised the methods used by Operation Yewtree, particularly the treatment of Paul Gambaccini, as well as the investigations of Cliff Richard and the Operation Midland cases of Leon Brittan and Edwin Bramall, for what he described as the radical undermining of the presumption of innocence. Richard Henriques conducted an inquiry into the Metropolitan Police's sexual abuse investigations and was critical of the handling of Operation Midland but reserved praise for Operation Yewtree. Gambaccini, Bramall and Harvey Proctor, who had been investigated by Operation Midland, sued the Metropolitan Police for £3m in February 2017. In November 2018, Gambaccini reached an out-of-court settlement with the Crown Prosecution Service and received an undisclosed amount in damages.

Operation Yewtree was the inspiration for a drama, National Treasure, starring Robbie Coltrane, Julie Walters and Andrea Riseborough. Coltrane played Paul Finchley, a fictional light-entertainment performer accused of rape, Walters played Finchley's wife Marie, and Riseborough played their daughter Danielle ("Dee"). The four-part series, by The Forge, was broadcast September–October 2016 on Channel 4. A Channel 4 documentary titled The Accused: National Treasures on Trial examined the investigation in 2022.

See also 
 Bill Cosby sexual assault cases
 Harvey Weinstein sexual abuse cases
 Me Too movement
 Post-assault treatment of sexual assault victims
 Sexual abuse in Hollywood
 Weinstein effect

References

External links 
 
 Giving Victims a Voice (NSPCC Library Online), joint report by the Metropolitan Police and NSPCC, published 11 January 2013
 "Jimmy Savile abuse cases: the detailed data", statistics and figures of the report from The Guardian

 
Y
2012 in the United Kingdom
2012 crimes in the United Kingdom
Jimmy Savile
Gary Glitter